The Paraguayan Olympic Committee or COP is the National Olympic Committee representing Paraguayan athletes in the International Olympic Committee (IOC) and the Pan American Games. It was created and recognized by the International Olympic Committee in 1970. It is based in Luque, Paraguay, in the Greater Asuncion area.

Pan American Games

Medal count

Medals by sport

Olympic Games

Medals by Summer Games

Medals by Winter Games

Medals by sport

See also
 Paraguay at the Olympics
 Paraguay at the Pan American Games

References

External links
 Official website 

Paraguay
Sports governing bodies in Paraguay
Paraguay at the Olympics
1970 establishments in Paraguay